The 2010 FIM OtoMoto.pl European Speedway Grand Prix was the first race of the 2010 Speedway Grand Prix season. It took place on April 24 at the Alfred Smoczyk Stadium in Leszno, Poland.

The Grand Prix was won by defending world champion Jason Crump from Australia, who beat Pole Jarosław Hampel, Russian Emil Sayfutdinov and Polish wild card Janusz Kołodziej.

Riders 

The Speedway Grand Prix Commission nominated Janusz Kołodziej as Wild Card, and Damian Baliński and Maciej Janowski both as Track Reserves. Potential candidate for wild card was Australian Leigh Adams, who is riding for Unia Leszno since 1996, and who is an honorary citizen of Leszno. The Draw was made on April 23 at 13:00 CEST by President (=Mayor) of Leszno Tomasz Malepszy.

Three Poles, Hampel, Kołodziej and Baliński are all riding for Unia Leszno, whose home track is at the Alfred Smoczyk Stadium, in the 2010 season in Poland.

Heat details

Heat after heat 
 Hampel, Harris, Bjerre, Hancock
 Pedersen, Holta, Kołodziej, Jonsson (R4)
 Sayfutdinov, Gollob, Lindgren, Woffinden
 Crump, Holder, Zetterström, Andersen
 Harris, Pedersen, Lindgren, Zetterström
 Kołodziej, Holder, Hampel, Gollob
 Crump, Bjerre, Jonsson, Woffinden
 Holta, Andersen, Sayfutdinov, Hancock
 Kołodziej, Andersen, Woffinden, Harris
 Crump, Hampel, Sayfutdinov, Pedersen
 Lindgren, Bjerre, Holta, Holder
 Hancock, Gollob, Jonsson, Zetterström
 Sayfutdinov, Holder, Jonsson, Harris
 Zetterström, Hampel, Holta, Woffinden
 Andersen, Bjerre, Gollob, Pedersen
 Lindgren, Kołodziej, Crump, Hancock
 Harris, Holta, Gollob, Crump
 Hampel, Jonsson, Andersen, Lindgren
 Bjerre, Sayfutdinov, Kołodziej, Zetterström
 Pedersen, Holder, Hancock, Woffinden
 Semi-Finals:
 Hampel, Kołodziej, Holta, Harris
 Crump, Sayfutdinov, Pedersen, Bjerre
 The Final:
 Crump, Hampel, Sayfutdinov, Kołodziej (X)

The intermediate classification

See also 
 Polski Związek Motorowy
 Unia Leszno

References 

European
Speedway Grand Prix of Europe
Sport in Greater Poland Voivodeship
Leszno
Speedway competitions in Poland